Walter Roger Brown (born February 23, 1950) is a retired American National Basketball Association (NBA) and American Basketball Association (ABA) basketball player.

Amateur career

A 6'11" center out of Englewood Technical Prep Academy in Chicago, he played collegiate basketball for the University of Kansas, averaging a double-double of 11.9 ppg and 11.3 rpg in his senior season, helping the Jayhawks to the Final Four in the 1971 NCAA University Division basketball tournament.

Professional career

Drafted in the 4th round by the Los Angeles Lakers in the 1971 NBA draft, Brown played one game for LA before being released.  He quickly signed with the Carolina Cougars of the rival ABA, averaging 2.4 ppg in limited duty.  He spent 1973-74 with the San Antonio Spurs and the  Virginia Squires in the ABA, but would sit out the 1974-75 season.

Brown started the 1975-76 season with the Denver Nuggets in the ABA, but would return to the NBA, signing with the Detroit Pistons in January 1976, and would spend the remainder of that season and the following 1977-78 season with Detroit, backing up All-Star Bob Lanier,  and helping Detroit to two post-season playoff berths.  Brown followed former Pistons coach Herb Brown to the Western Basketball Association and the Tucson Gunners for 1978-79, winning a WBL championship with a third-team All-WBL season.  He would then return to the NBA in 1979 with his hometown Chicago Bulls for a 4-game stint to finish his professional career.

References

External links

1950 births
Living people
African-American basketball players
American men's basketball players
Basketball players from Chicago
Carolina Cougars players
Centers (basketball)
Chicago Bulls players
Denver Nuggets players
Detroit Pistons players
Kansas Jayhawks men's basketball players
Los Angeles Lakers draft picks
Los Angeles Lakers players
San Antonio Spurs players
Virginia Squires players
21st-century African-American people
20th-century African-American sportspeople